Media classification in Singapore is currently administered by the Infocomm Media Development Authority (IMDA). All forms of media, including films, TV programs, video games, and theatrical productions, must receive an age classification before widespread distribution.

Background 

Prior to 1991, the Singaporean government did not have an official classification system. Instead, works were either unconditionally allowed, partially censored, or completely banned. Starting from June 1991, the Media Development Authority (MDA) instituted a ratings system with 3 ratings – General Audience (G), Parental Guidance (PG), and Restricted 18 (R18). Over the years, new ratings have been added and modified, and the current system as of 2022 now has 6 possible classifications. In 2016, the MDA and the Infocomm Development Authority were merged together – as the successor of the merged authorities, the IMDA is the current regulator.

Classifications 
There are classification systems for the following types of media: films, TV programs, video games, and arts entertainment (e.g., theatrical productions).

Films and TV 
Films and TV programs both use the same rating system. Free-to-air TV content must also adhere to additional restrictions, as outlined in Section 5 of the Content Code.

Video games 
Following a controversy in November 2007, in which the government banned the video game Mass Effect, and then unbanned it a day later, over concerns that the game featured homosexuality, the IMDA announced that it would create a new classification system for games in early 2008. Therefore, starting from April 2008, video games that were sold in Singapore were required to undergo classification. 

As of 2022, there are 2 ratings in the classification system. Games only need to be classified if they are physically sold in Singapore - however, some digital storefronts like Steam may display the IMDA rating to Singaporean users if one is present.

References 

Mass media in Singapore